Kevin Sargent may refer to:

Kevin Sargent (American football) (born 1969), American football player
Kevin Sargent (composer), film and television composer